Los Chiles Airport  is an airport serving the town of Los Chiles in Alajuela Province, Costa Rica.

The Los Chiles non-directional beacon (Ident: CHI) is located on the field.

See also

 Transport in Costa Rica
 List of airports in Costa Rica

References

External links
 OurAirports - Los Chiles
 OpenStreetMap - Los Chiles
 FallingRain - Los Chiles
 

Airports in Costa Rica
Alajuela Province